Maurice Lemay (born February 18, 1962) is a Canadian former professional ice hockey player who played 317 games in the National Hockey League. He played for the Vancouver Canucks, Edmonton Oilers, Boston Bruins and Winnipeg Jets. Lemay won the Stanley Cup with Edmonton in 1987. He moved to Europe in 1989 and spent several years playing in the 2nd Bundesliga, the second-tier league in Germany, before retiring in 2000.

Lemay was born in Saskatoon, Saskatchewan. As a youth, he played in the 1975 Quebec International Pee-Wee Hockey Tournament with a minor ice hockey team from South Ottawa.

Career statistics

Regular season and playoffs

International

References

External links

1962 births
Living people
Boston Bruins players
Canadian ice hockey forwards
ECD Sauderland players
Edmonton Oilers players
Fredericton Express players
Hamburg Crocodiles players
Hannover EC players
Ice hockey people from Saskatchewan
Maine Mariners players
Ottawa 67's players
Ottawa Loggers players
Rote Teufel Bad Nauheim players
Sportspeople from Saskatoon
Stanley Cup champions
Vancouver Canucks draft picks
Vancouver Canucks players
Wedemark Scorpions players
Winnipeg Jets (1979–1996) players